Edgard Fabián Etchenique Picardo (born 13 October 1967), known professionally as Marco Banderas, is a Spanish pornographic actor of Uruguayan origin.

Early life
Banderas was born in Uruguay and raised in Barcelona. He speaks Spanish, Portuguese, Italian and Catalan.

Career
Banderas and his wife, Lisa DeMarco, worked at the Bagdad Sex Club for three years where they were approached by Nacho Vidal during the Barcelona International Erotic Film Festival. He entered the adult film industry in 2005 under the stage name Marco Duato. He became frustrated with the surname because it was often misspelled as "Duarte", so he changed it to "Banderas".

Banderas launched his own production company, Hot Zone Productions, in April 2007, signed a distribution deal with American Xcess in August, and released the company's first film, Marco Banderas’ Crazy Dreams, in September. In October 2013, he launched his own website, marcobanderas.xxx.

In January 2008, sex toy manufacturer Topco Sales unveiled a replica of Banderas' penis as part of their "Wildfire Celebrity Series".

In May 2012, Banderas signed a contract with Magnum Contenidos Multimedia (MCM) to produce Porn Valley Dream, a reality television series documenting his life.

Personal life
Banderas married Fiona "Lisa" DeMarco on 1 September 2001 and eventually divorced. He has an "I Love Fiona" tattoo, DeMarco's real name. He then married Briana Bounce on 15 November 2016 in Moscow, Russia.

Awards and nominations

Songs

 [3:21] Dulce veneno
 [4:13] Volveras
 [3:19] The Porn Life
 [4:05] Sin Ti

References

External links

 
 
 
 
 

1967 births
Living people
People from Barcelona
Singers from Montevideo
Spanish male pornographic film actors
21st-century Spanish male singers
21st-century Spanish singers
Spanish pornographic film directors
Spanish pornographic film producers
21st-century Uruguayan male singers